The Wales West Light Railway is a 1.6-kilometre (1 mi)  narrow gauge tourist railway in Silverhill, Alabama owned by Ann and Ken Zadnichek. It is built to simulate a Welsh narrow gauge railway. The railway and associated RV park host over 30,000 visitors annually.

Rolling stock

Locomotives

Dame Ann

Dame Ann is an 11,700-pound  steam locomotive built by Exmoor Steam Railway in Bratton Fleming, England. Her steam trials were completed at the Launceston Steam Railway in Cornwall. She was delivered to the Wales West Light Railway in 2004. Dame Ann is based on the Penrhyn Port Class locomotive built by Hunslet Engine Company in the 19th century. At the time of her construction, she was the first Port Class Hunslet engine built in 83 years.

Gareth
Gareth is a Simplex 40S diesel locomotive built by British locomotive-building company Motor Rail in the mid 1960s. The two thousand pound locomotive was purchased from Alan Keef Ltd for use in the construction of the Wales West Light Railway. Gareth originally featured steam out-line body and had been used to pull a single car train in Scotland. His new owners replaced the steam out-line body with a body modeled after the Simplex-type diesels produced by Alan Keef in the 1980s.

Passenger cars
Passenger cars on the Wales West Light Railway are replicas based on plans dating to the 19th century. They are built of wood over steel frames with wheels imported from England, and are equipped with modern air brakes.

7.5-inch railway
Wales West Light Railway also operates a shorter 7.5" gauge miniature ridable railway.

References

External links

Wales West Website
Video on Youtube
More information on the Motor Rail Simplex 40S
Simplex 40S history

Heritage railroads in Alabama
Narrow gauge railroads in Alabama
2 ft gauge railways in the United States
7½ in gauge railways in the United States
Transportation in Baldwin County, Alabama
Museums in Baldwin County, Alabama
Railroad museums in Alabama
Railway lines opened in 2004
Railway services introduced in 2004
Tourist attractions in Baldwin County, Alabama
Baldwin County, Alabama
Narrow gauge steam locomotives of the United States